The Portrait of an American Family Tour was Marilyn Manson's first headlining tour. It was launched in support of the band's first full-length debut album, Portrait of an American Family, which was released on July 19, 1994, five months before the tour began.

The tour began on December 27, 1994, in Jacksonville, Florida, at Club 5. After this show, the first night of the tour, frontman Marilyn Manson was arrested and taken into custody for violating the Adult Entertainment Code by allegedly donning a strap-on dildo on stage. In spite of this, Manson was freed and the band appeared in Orlando the following night as scheduled.

The tour concluded on March 11, 1995, after the band had played 43 shows. The last show was played in Columbia, South Carolina, at the Alcatrazz venue.

Lineup
Marilyn Manson: Vocals
Daisy Berkowitz: Guitar
Twiggy Ramirez: Bass
Madonna Wayne Gacy: Keyboard
Sara Lee Lucas: Drums

Stage antics
During these concerts, the stage was usually arranged with living room décor, not unlike that on the cover of Portrait of an American Family. A table with a lamp was the most commonly seen piece at the shows. The first and last shows included the most memorable incidents of the tour. On December 27, 1994, Manson was misidentified as "jacking off a strap-on dildo" and "urinating on the crowd," resulting in his arrest just one night into the tour. When concluding the concerts with a South Carolina show on March 11, 1995, Manson slipped on a beer bottle, smashing it. Angry, Manson picked up a piece of the bottle and cut his chest "from one side to the other," his first act of notoriously cutting himself on-stage. Closing the performance, the band also ignited drummer Sara Lee Lucas' kit in an attempt to ignite only his bass drum. Claims that Lucas himself was lit aflame have been made by Manson but are disputed by Lucas.

Tour overview
The tour ran from December 27, 1994, to March 11, 1995. The band completed 44 shows.
The performances in Carrboro and Columbia were rescheduled to the last two dates of the tour. These performances were originally scheduled for February 16, 1994, and February 18, 1994, respectively.

Tour dates

References
Notes

Footnotes

Marilyn Manson (band) concert tours
1994 concert tours
1995 concert tours